These hits topped the Dutch Top 40 in 1989.

See also
1989 in music

References

1989 in the Netherlands
1989 record charts
1989